The Hungary men's national under-20 basketball team is a national basketball team of Hungary, administered by the Hungarian Basketball Federation. It represents the country in international men's under-20 basketball competitions.

FIBA U20 European Championship participations

See also
Hungary men's national basketball team
Hungary men's national under-18 basketball team
Hungary women's national under-20 basketball team

References

External links
Archived records of Hungary team participations

Basketball in Hungary
U
Basketball
Men's national under-20 basketball teams